Thomas Patrick O'Malley (born December 25, 1960) is a former Major League baseball player born in Orange, New Jersey, and raised in Montoursville, Pennsylvania in the United States. He played for the San Francisco Giants, Chicago White Sox, Baltimore Orioles, Texas Rangers, Montreal Expos, and New York Mets. He also spent six highly successful seasons in the Japanese Central League with the Hanshin Tigers and Yakult Swallows. He also worked as a manager for the Newark Bears in the Atlantic League of Professional Baseball after retiring.

Biography

O'Malley was drafted by the San Francisco Giants in 1979, and made his major league debut with the Giants in 1982. He played in 135 major league games in 1983, but split time with the majors and minors afterwards, spending nine years playing for six different teams. He was acquired by the Orioles from the Tigers for Luis Rosado on May 23, 1985. He introduced Jim Paciorek to the Tigers in 1992, and managed to put the struggling Tigers in second place that year.

The Swallows won the Japan Series that year, and O'Malley was awarded both the season MVP award, and the Japan Series MVP award.

He returned to the major leagues to spend spring training with the Texas Rangers, but retired after he was cut from the team.

He returned to Japan during the Hanshin Tigers  spring training camp, and served as a batting coach throughout the season. O'Malley resigned from his coaching job after Senichi Hoshino resigned from his managerial position. He scouted players in the major and minor leagues for the Hanshin Tigers until 2009, and traveled to Japan during spring training to offer advice to non-Japanese players. He has appeared in various television commercials in the local Kansai region (Hanshin Electric Railway Co., Ltd.), and posters featuring O'Malley could be found in Koshien Stadium.

References

External links

1960 births
Living people
People from Orange, New Jersey
Sportspeople from Essex County, New Jersey
Major League Baseball third basemen
Baseball players from New Jersey
San Francisco Giants players
Chicago White Sox players
Baltimore Orioles players
Texas Rangers players
Montreal Expos players
New York Mets players
Nippon Professional Baseball infielders
Hanshin Tigers players
Yakult Swallows players
American expatriate baseball players in Canada
American expatriate baseball players in Japan
Nashville Sounds players
Minor league baseball managers
Nippon Professional Baseball MVP Award winners
Nippon Professional Baseball coaches
Newark Bears players
International League MVP award winners